Ernst Hiemer (5 July 1900 in Großweingarten – 29 July 1974 in Altötting) was a German writer, who worked closely with Julius Streicher, the founder of the anti-Semitic newspaper Der Stürmer. Hiemer's three main books were all published in the Second World War and had anti-Semitic themes.

Biography
Hiemer began working with Julius Streicher in the 1920s, as a journalist for Streicher's weekly anti-Semitic newspaper Der Stürmer, for which he reported on trials of Jewish offenders. Using the knowledge and experience he had gained working as a teacher, Hiemer wrote two anti-Semitic books for children which were both published by Julius Streicher's Stürmer publishing house. The first of these was Der Giftpilz (The Poisonous Mushroom), published in 1938. This was a collection of 17 short stories, illustrated by 'Fips' (Philipp Rupprecht). It was followed in 1940 by another collection, Der Pudelmopsdackelpinscher und andere besinnliche Erzahlungen (The Poodle-Pug-Dachshund-Pinscher and other contemplative stories), which compared Jews to various forms of animals. These publications were amongst the most extreme anti-Semitic items produced for children under the Nazi regime, causing them to be the subject of negative comments from some Nazis. During this time, Hiemer was also the chief editor of Der Stürmer. In 1942, he published a collection of anti-Semitic proverbs entitled Der Jude im Sprichwort der Völker.

After the war, Hiemer was interned for three and a half years at Stalag XIII-D, and banned from teaching for life. He died on 29 July 1974 in Altötting, Bavaria.

Bibliography
Der Giftpilz (The Poisonous Mushroom) (Nuremberg: Stürmerverlag, 1938).
Der Pudelmopsdackelpinscher (The Poodle-Pug-Dachshund-Pinscher, 1940) (Nuremberg: Der Stürmer-Buchverlag)
Der Jude im Sprichwort der Völker (Nuremberg, 1942)

References

External links
Excerpts from Der Pudelmopsdackelpinscher and Der Giftpilz at the German Propaganda Archive
Articles from Der Stürmer: 1935, 1942 and 1943
Full text of Der Giftpilz in German and in English at the Internet Archive
Full text of Der Jude im Sprichwort der Voelker at the Internet Archive

1900 births
1974 deaths
German newspaper editors
Nazi propaganda
Nazi propagandists
German male non-fiction writers
People from Roth (district)
Antisemitic publications